Katherine Anne Blackwell (born 31 August 1983) is a former Australian cricketer. Blackwell was born in Wagga Wagga, but raised in Yenda, a small rural town outside of Griffith, New South Wales. She and her identical twin sister Alex Blackwell were part of the Australian national team that won the 2005 Women's Cricket World Cup in South Africa. In the 2005–06 season she played for the Wellington Blaze in the State League.

Kate Blackwell played four Tests and 41 One Day International matches for Australia. She is the 145th woman to play Test cricket for Australia, and the 102nd woman to play One Day International cricket for Australia.

 she has played 136 domestic limited-overs matches including	82 Women's National Cricket League games for the New South Wales Breakers.

Blackwell along with Karen Rolton holds the record for the highest 4th wicket runstand in WT20I history (sharing 147*)

When asked about the frequent comparisons in the Australian media of the Blackwell twins to male cricketers, she said, "We look up to them a lot, but female cricketers should be recognised for themselves, not as the equivalent of Mark Waugh or Steve Waugh or Matthew Hayden or anybody."

References 

1983 births
Australia women One Day International cricketers
Australia women Test cricketers
Australia women Twenty20 International cricketers
Cricketers from New South Wales
Identical twins
Living people
Middlesex women cricketers
New South Wales Breakers cricketers
People educated at Barker College
Sportspeople from Wagga Wagga
Australian twins
Twin sportspeople
Wellington Blaze cricketers
Western Australia women cricketers